Allahian (also Romanized as Allāhīān, Eláhīān, Allāhayān, Allāhīyān, Allāhyān, Allayan, Elahīān, and Elahiyan) is a village in Shirin Darreh Rural District, in the Central District of Quchan County, Razavi Khorasan Province, Iran. At the 2006 census, its population was 758, in 164 families.

See also 

 List of cities, towns and villages in Razavi Khorasan Province

References 

Populated places in Quchan County